The 1936–37 season was Galatasaray SK's 33rd in existence and the club's 25th consecutive season in the Istanbul Football League.

Squad statistics

Squad changes for the 1936–37 season
In:

Competitions

Istanbul Football League

Classification

Matches

Kick-off listed in local time (EEST)

Milli Küme

Classification

Matches

Friendly Matches

Ankara Stadyum Kupası

References
 Atabeyoğlu, Cem. 1453-1991 Türk Spor Tarihi Ansiklopedisi. page(142-143).(1991) An Grafik Basın Sanayi ve Ticaret AŞ
 Tekil, Süleyman. Dünden bugüne Galatasaray, (1983), page(75-76, 113-116, 182). Arset Matbaacılık Kol.Şti.
 Futbol vol.2. Galatasaray. Page: 564, 585. Tercüman Spor Ansiklopedisi. (1981)Tercüman Gazetecilik ve Matbaacılık AŞ.
 1937 Milli Küme Maçları. Türk Futbol Tarihi vol.1. page(80). (June 1992) Türkiye Futbol Federasyonu Yayınları.
 Cumhuriyet Newspaper Archives. March 1937.

External links
 Galatasaray Sports Club Official Website 
 Turkish Football Federation - Galatasaray A.Ş. 
 uefa.com - Galatasaray AŞ

Galatasaray S.K. (football) seasons
Turkish football clubs 1936–37 season
1930s in Istanbul